Acanthopale is a plant genus in the Acanthaceae plant family. The genus name is based on the classic Greek words for thorn ákantha and stake palum. Some species in the genus are cultivated as ornamental plants.

Species 
Genus Acanthopale
Acanthopale albosetulosa
Acanthopale aethiopica
Acanthopale azaleoides
Acanthopale confertiflora
Acanthopale decempedalis
Acanthopale longipilosa
Acanthopale macrocarpa Vollesen
Acanthopale pubescens
Acanthopale tetrasperma

Generally unaccepted species 
Acanthopale cameronensis
Acanthopale cuneifolia
Acanthopale humblotii
Acanthopale madagascariensis
Acanthopale ramiflora

Synonyms 
Acanthopale laxiflora (syn. Acanthopale decempedalis)
Acanthopale cameronica (syn. Acanthopale decempedalis)
Dischistocalyx laxifloris (syn. Acanthopale decempedalis)
Acanthopale buchholzii (syn. Dischistocalyx grandifolius)

References 
Clarke, C. B. 1900. Acanthaceae, Vol 5. In: Flora of Tropical Africa (ed. W. T. Thiselton-Dyer). Lovell Reeve & Co., London.
Tripp, E. A. Evolutionary relationships within the species-rich genus Ruellia (Acanthaceae). Systematic Botany, in press. 
Darbyshire, I. 2004. Acanthopale decempedalis . 2006 IUCN Red List of Threatened Species. Bajado el 20-08-07. 2004. Acanthopale decempedalis. 2006 IUCN Red List of Threatened Species. Downloaded the 20-08-07.

External links 
on the Tree of Life Web Project
 Information of the genus Acanthopale
|Acanthopale on the African Plant Database

Acanthaceae
Acanthaceae genera
Taxonomy articles created by Polbot